The Rugby Channel was New Zealand's only channel dedicated to the national sport of rugby union. When live matches were not on, the channel screened classic games and documentaries relating to the sport. It was the only channel committed to showing all major matches in the widescreen 16:9 ratio popular with newer television sets, but from August 2008 Sky Sport changed to widescreen as well after My Sky HDi was launched.  However, Rugby Channel viewers could exclusively watch the press conferences following major rugby matches, and could watch most major European rugby games as well. It also screened live and exclusive college 1st XV matches then replayed on Sky Sport later in the week.

Closure
The Rugby Channel closed on 31 July 2019. From 1 August 2019, all of The Rugby Channel's programming was moved to Sky Sport 1, making Sky Sport 1 a 24/7 rugby channel. The final program aired on The Rugby Channel was a documentary, Greats of Super Rugby: Christian Cullen.

External links

The Rugby Channel at LyngSat Address
The RugbyStream Channel at UK

References

Television channels in New Zealand
Defunct television channels in New Zealand
Sports television networks in New Zealand
Television channels and stations established in 2002
English-language television stations in New Zealand
2002 establishments in New Zealand